The Turkoman horse, or Turkmene, was an Oriental horse breed from the steppes of Turkoman desert. Its closest modern descendant is thought to be the Akhal-Teke. It influenced many modern horse breeds, including the Thoroughbred horse.  Some horses bred in Iran and Turkmenistan today are still referred to as Turkoman, and have similar characteristics.

Modern descendants include the Akhal-Teke, the Iomud (also called Yamud or Yomud), the Goklan and Nokhorli.

Characteristics

The Turkoman horse was noted for its endurance. It had a slender body, similar to a greyhound. Although refined in appearance, the breed was actually one of the toughest in the world. They had a straight profile, long neck, and sloping shoulders. Their back was long, with sloping quarters and tucked-up abdomen. They had long and muscular legs. The horses ranged from 15–16 hands.

The Turkoman and the Arabian compared

Though both the Arabian horse and the Turkoman may have had a common ancestor in the Oriental horse prototype, in their purest old forms they were very like one another in some ways and very different in others. Both had excellent speed and stamina. Both had extremely fine coats and delicate skin, unlike many horse breeds found in Europe. They both had large eyes, wide foreheads and tapering muzzles. They both came from very arid environments. Here, however, the similarities between the Turkoman of Central Asia and the Arabians of the Nejd desert lands of Central Arabia end, and the horses begin to diverge to suit their environments and the fighting styles of their breeders. Some divergence may be attributable solely to natural selection of landrace traits, other differences may be attributable to selective breeding.

The Turkoman had small hooves, an adaptation to the steppes of the Central Asia, which largely consisted of a hard, rocky ground, covered with coarse sand, more like fine gravel and of stiff, parched vegetation. The Arabian had fairly large hooves for its size; this was useful when adjusting to the deep sand found in the Central Arabian desert, providing a larger surface area on which the horse's weight could be spread, making it less likely to sink.

The back of the Turkoman, the Tekke Turkoman, and today in many cases, the Akhal-Teke, is much longer than that of the Arabian. The reason for this may likely to be that when riding long distances, the Turkoman was expected to trot, and the Arabian was not; the Bedouin tended to ride camels over long distances, leading their war horses, saving them for raiding, which was primarily done at the gallop.

The Turkoman was taller than the desert-bred Arabian and had a sparse mane. The Arabian carries its tail high when galloping, and higher than most when walking or trotting; the Turkoman ran with its tail streaming behind. The Turkoman horse was also narrower in the body than the Arabian, or indeed than any other breed of horse. This helped it to dissipate heat quickly, but it was also a great aid in twisting and turning in the saddle, which would be invaluable to mounted archers who need to shoot in any direction, as opposed to lancers who need a firm footing from which to thrust a lance. Lance-throwing from horseback would be far easier on an Arabian horse shaped wider in the body would also help with making the sharp turns that close-fighting requires.

In other words, the Turkoman was the ideal horse for the Turkmen, and the Arabian was the ideal horse for the Bedouin.

History

The breed was developed from an ancient Oriental horsekeeping tradition and breeding philosophy.   The horses were raised in an unusual manner, with the mares kept in semi-wild herds that have to defend themselves against the weather and predators and finding their own food. Male foals, colts were caught at six months, when their training begun. The colts were kept on long tethers, usually for life. At only eight months of age, they were saddled and ridden by young and lightweight riders, racing on the track, by the age of one. These horses were bred for racing. They had free-flowing movements and a good temperament. 

The Turkoman horses were fed a special high-protein diet of broiled chicken, barley, dates, raisins, alfalfa, and mutton fat.

How much the Arabian and the Turkoman have been crossed in the past is open to debate. There are those who believe that this was never done, on either side; and it may well be that in remote places like the Nejd the core Arabian was kept "pure," just as the Turkoman would have been kept "pure" by the most remote tribes of Turkmen.

However, it is very likely that there was some intermingling between these two types of Oriental horses, especially where their borders met. Turkoman stallions were kept for use by the elite palace guards of the Caliph of Baghdad, and that it was these stallions which the Caliph used for breeding with his Arabian mares. It may have been from these horses that the Muniq'i strain of Arabian arose, a strain with known crosses to Turkoman horses some time during the 17th century.

"Turks" and the English Thoroughbred
The Turkoman horse may have influenced the English Thoroughbred, most notably via the Byerley Turk. However, it has also been argued—mainly by Arabian breeder Lady Wentworth—that all the "Turks" listed in Weatherby's General Stud Book are actually "Arabians of the highest class" who are only called Turks because they were bought or taken as prizes of war in Turkey and the Crimea. There is, however, evidence that the "Turks" were actually Turkomans and not mislabelled Arabians.

The confusion was probably due to several contributing factors. One of them was that when the first Oriental horses were imported to England, it simply did not matter what kind of horse it was, as long it was elegant, fast and could race. In England, as Sidney tells us, "Every Oriental horse -- Turk, Barb or Egyptian bred -- is called an Arab in this country."

The first Turkoman recorded in England is said by Marvin to have been a stallion brought over by Colonel Valentine Baker, who wished to see it used to breed with the English Thoroughbred. However, there is no evidence that this happened.

Turkomans were brought to England by soldiers stationed in various parts of the East, the most famous of them was the stallion called Merv, who was brought to England by Baker Pasha in the 19th century. What was so astonishing about Merv was the incredibly high stud fee which was charged for his services, £85, which at that time was considered exorbitant for any stallion. Unfortunately, other Englishmen did not esteem Merv the way Baker Pacha did. Sidney quotes a correspondent who had seen Merv and stated: "He looked to me about 16 hands high, fine shoulders, good head and neck, fine skin, good wearing legs, bad feet and leggy. I thought him unsuited to breed hunters ... he looked to me about an 11 stone horse, and did not like going through dirt." Merv covered no mares in England, and in 1877 he was sold to the Earl of Claremont's stud in Ireland.

On the European continent

Turkoman horses, aside from being occasional gifts of state, were often brought into Western Europe by various individuals, mostly connected with the military in some way. Some of these horses have had a profound impact on various European warmblood breeds.

During the late Middle Ages and the Renaissance, one of the most universally acclaimed war and racing horses in Europe was the Neapolitan Courser. Though much heavier than the Turkoman horse, it may have had some Turkoman ancestry. Gervase Markham, Master of Horse to James I of England, describes the Neapolitan horses in terms which will sound very familiar to the fancier of the Turanian horses:

Markham preferred the English Thoroughbred first among all breeds of horses; the Neapolitan second, and the steppe-bred Turk third. He had seen Turks racing on English race courses, circa 1566–1625. He also noted that the Turks he had seen were: "Naturally in they desire to amble, and, which is most strange, their trot is full of pride and gracefulness."

References

Further reading

 Heritage of Central Asia, from Antiquity to the Turkish Conquest, R. Frye
 Illustrated Book of the Horse, S. Sidney, Wilshire Book Company, 1875
 Authentic Arabian Horse and His Descendants, Lady Wentworth, 1945
 Rewriting the Stud Book, Melanie Cabel-Allerstone, Country Life, January 1993
 Illustrated Book of the Horse, S. Sidney, Wilshire Book Company, 1875
 http://www.lrgaf.org/articles/foundation-turks.htm

Extinct horse breeds
Horse breeds originating in Turkmenistan
Horse breeds